The Dominion 2009 Northern Ontario Provincial Men's Championship (Northern Ontario's men's provincial curling championship) was held February 10-14 at the Fort Frances Curling Club in Fort Frances. The winning team of Mike Jakubo represented Northern Ontario at the 2009 Tim Hortons Brier in Calgary.

Teams

Draw Brackets

A Event

B Event

C Event

Results

Draw 1
February 10, 0900

Draw 2
February 10, 1430

Draw 3
February 10, 1930

Draw 4
February 11, 0900

Draw 5
February 11, 1400

Draw 6
February 11, 1900

Draw 7
February 12, 0900

Draw 8
February 12, 1400

Draw 9
February 12, 1900

Draw 10
February 13, 0900

Draw 11
February 13, 1400

Playoffs

A vs. B
February 13, 1900

C1 vs. C2
February 13, 1900

Semifinal
February 14, 1300

Final
February 14, 1900

External links
Fort Frances Curling Club

2009 Tim Hortons Brier
Fort Frances
Curling in Northern Ontario
2009 in Ontario
February 2009 sports events in Canada